Gabriele Grossi (born February 11, 1972 in Rome) is a retired Italian professional football player. 

He played 6 seasons (45 games and 1 goal) in the Serie A.

External links
 Career summary by playerhistory.com 

1972 births
Living people
Italian footballers
Italy under-21 international footballers
Serie A players
Serie B players
U.S. Lecce players
A.S. Roma players
S.S.C. Bari players
S.S.C. Napoli players
L.R. Vicenza players
A.C. Reggiana 1919 players
A.C. Perugia Calcio players
L'Aquila Calcio 1927 players

Association football defenders